The Cross Border Orchestra of Ireland (CBOI) is one of Ireland's primary youth orchestras. Based at the Dundalk Institute of Technology in County Louth, the CBOI maintains a membership of 160 young musicians between the ages of 12 and 24 years from both sides of the border.

History

The CBOI was established in 1995 shortly after the implementation of the Peace Process and is recognised internationally as one of Ireland's flagship peace initiatives.

Events

The CBOI tours regularly to Europe and America and has sold out such prestigious venues as Carnegie Hall, in New York and Chicago's Symphony Hall.  In April 2008 the Orchestra performed at the 400th Anniversary of the Flight of the Earls in Rome. In October 2009, the orchestra traveled to New York and Washington to play at the Lincoln Center and at Fairfields Cross Cultural Youth Festival. In October 2012, the orchestra traveled to London and performed in the Royal Albert Hall.

See also 
 List of youth orchestras

References 

Youth orchestras
European youth orchestras